The 2015–16 Texas Tech Red Raiders basketball team represented Texas Tech University in the 2015–16 NCAA Division I men's basketball season. The Red Raiders were led by the 2016 Big 12 coach of the year Tubby Smith. They played their home games at the United Supermarkets Arena in Lubbock, Texas and were members of the Big 12 Conference. They finished the season 19–13, 9–9 in Big 12 play to finish in seventh place. They lost in the first round of the Big 12 tournament to TCU. They received an at-large bid to the NCAA tournament where they lost in the first round to Butler.

Smith departed for the head coaching job with the University of Memphis on April 14, 2016.

Previous season 
The Red Raiders finished the season 13–19 (3–15 in Big 12 play) to finish in last place in the Big 12. They lost in the first round of the Big 12 tournament to the Texas Longhorns.

Departures

Incoming Transfers

Recruits

Roster

Schedule

|-
!colspan=12 style="background:#CC0000; color:black;"| Exhibition

|-
!colspan=12 style="background:#CC0000; color:black;"| Non-conference

|-
!colspan=12 style="background:#CC0000; color:black;"| Conference games

|-
!colspan=12 style="background:#CC0000; color:black;"| Big 12 Tournament

|-
!colspan=12 style="background:#CC0000; color:black;"| NCAA tournament

External links
Official Texas Tech Red Raiders men's basketball page

Texas Tech Red Raiders basketball seasons
Texas Tech
Texas Tech
Texas Tech
Texas Tech